Monkey Bay Airport  is an airport serving the Lake Malawi port town of Monkey Bay, in the Southern Region of Malawi.

There is high terrain northwest of the airport.

Airlines and destinations

Passenger

See also

Transport in Malawi
List of airports in Malawi

References

External links
OpenStreetMap - Monkey Bay
OurAirports - Monkey Bay Airport
FallingRain - Monkey Bay Airport

Airports in Malawi
Buildings and structures in Southern Region, Malawi